Video Voyeur or Video Voyeur: The Susan Wilson Story is a 2002 American television drama directed by Tim Hunter and starring Angie Harmon. Made by Lifetime Television, it is based on the real-life story of Susan Wilson, a Louisiana woman, who was videotaped in her own home by a neighbor. Her case helped make video voyeurism a crime in nine U.S. states. Originally, she had no legal recourse as video voyeurism was not considered by those who wrote previous voyeurism legislation.

Cast
Angie Harmon as Susan Wilson
Jamey Sheridan as Steve Glover
Dale Midkiff as Gary Wilson

References

External links
 
 
 Video Voyeur at Reel Film Reviews
 Proposed Video Voyeurism Prevention Acts  at Library of Congress

2002 television films
2002 films
2002 crime drama films
American crime drama films
Films directed by Tim Hunter
Films set in Louisiana
Lifetime (TV network) films
Crime films based on actual events
Films scored by Daniel Licht
2000s English-language films
2000s American films